Manhattan Beach Jewish Center is a historic synagogue and community center located in the Manhattan Beach neighborhood of Brooklyn, Kings County, New York. Located at 60 West End Avenue, the synagogue was completed in 1952. It was designed by Jacob W. Sherman in the Bauhaus style, similar to European synagogues of the 1930s, Ten years after the synagogue was opened, the adjoining seven-story community center was built. It is an example of the "Jewish Center" movement which was coming into its own at the time.  The synagogue is a two-story-and-mezzanine Modern Movement building with a limestone façade and granite base.  It has a short tower and recessed shallow entrance porch, flanked on either side by a single unadorned column.

The Orthodox Jewish community which built the synagogue and adjoining community center is itself over 90 years old.

During Superstorm Sandy, the Center experienced serious damage. NYS Assemblyman Steven Cymbrowitz reported witnessing 350,000 gallons of water and oil being pumped out of the basement. Two years after the storm, the Center was still recovering.

It was listed on the National Register of Historic Places in 2015, one of only two properties in all of New York City to be nominated for the distinction by then-Governor Andrew Cuomo, to both the State and National Registers of Historic Places.

References

External links
Manhattan Beach Jewish Center website

Manhattan Beach, Brooklyn
Synagogues completed in 1952
Properties of religious function on the National Register of Historic Places in Brooklyn
Synagogues in Brooklyn
Synagogues on the National Register of Historic Places in New York City
Modernist synagogues